Lake Marmara is a lake in Manisa Province, western Turkey, bordered by the district areas of Gölmarmara to the northwest, whose name itself is inspired by the lake, and in larger part by Salihli.

Aside from being a recreational center for the province as a whole, Lake Marmara is also an important source for fishing and agricultural irrigation and an Important Bird Area.

In the early stages of Anatolian history, the lake was famous as a resort center for the Lydians, at a short distance from their capital, and was called under various names throughout history, the most notable being "Lake Gyges" or "Gygaean Lake" and "Lake Coloe" or "Lake Koloe”. Several archaeological sites are located nearby including Sardis, Bin Tepe, and Kaymakçı.

Footnotes

Landforms of Manisa Province
Marmara
Geography of ancient Lydia
Important Bird Areas of Turkey